On 25 May 2015, a mass murder took place at the Bouchoucha military base in Tunis. A Tunisian soldier, later identified as Corporal Mehdi Jemaii, who was forbidden from carrying weapons, stabbed a soldier, then took his weapon. He then opened fire on soldiers during a flag-raising ceremony, killing seven and wounding ten, including one seriously injured who died on May 31, before he was killed during an exchange of gunfire.

The army claimed Mehdi Jemaii had "family and psychological problems," and brushed off assertions the attack was terror-related, calling it an "isolated incident". The shooting happened two months after the Bardo National Museum attack.

See also
 2009 Fort Hood shooting
 2014 Fort Hood shootings
 List of rampage killers (workplace killings)

References

External links
Base militaire Bouchoucha on Wikimapia

2015 murders in Tunisia
2015 mass shootings in Africa
2015 barracks shooting
Deaths by firearm in Tunisia
Mass murder in 2015
Mass murder in Tunisia
May 2015 crimes in Africa
May 2015 events in Africa
2015 barracks shooting